Whitney Chewston (born September 8, 2016), also known as the Homophobic Dog, is a miniature dachshund who has become an influencer and brand ambassador as a result of her fame. After becoming associated with an internet meme in 2021, Chewston has gained a significant following with over 201,000 followers on Instagram as of March 2023.

Biography 
Chewston was born on September 8, 2016, in Columbus, Ohio, and was adopted by her owners Logan Hickman and Ben Campbell. Hickman recalls that his sister had initially wanted to get another dachshund from a breeder, but was dissuaded by her husband. Instead, he convinced Hickman to visit the breeder, and there she had spotted a newly born Chewston.

Career

2016–2021: Local sensation 
Chewston began her social media journey on Instagram as a result of her owners wanting to share puppy photos with their families. After several complaints, Chewston was given a personal account to post from. She had gained notable traction within Columbus, becoming a local internet celebrity and having multiple articles written about her, all while hovering at around 40 thousand followers in early 2021.

2021–present: The Homophobic Dog 
In March 2021, an Instagram user added text stating "not too fond of gay people" to a photo of Chewston beside a glass of red wine taken in 2019. This initial image later circulated on many social media websites for months and grew in popularity in early 2022 on Twitter, gaining her the nickname the "Homophobic Dog". Users posted the image, including some variants like "just saw something lgbt [sic]," "i know what you are," and "f slur," often circulated by people in the LGBT community in a satirical way. These pictures are often posed in response to people or corporations that have cultivated or expressed anti-LGBT rhetoric, with one of the most frequent recipients being Chick-fil-A.

While the meme continued to grow, users discovered that Chewston's owners were a married homosexual couple. As a result, a storyline for Chewston was created where she had started as homophobic, tolerated the LGBT community, and finally then coming out as LGBT.  Her owners have expressed in recent years that Chewston is an advocate of LGBT rights, and recent pictures have shown her donning rainbow attire.  

Some celebrities have shared memes inspired by Chewston, with one of the most notable being Lil Nas X posting an image to promote his and YoungBoy Never Broke Again's single Late to da Party.

Controversies 
On May 15, 2022, a tweet of a fake Washington Post article titled "This dog is the new face of online homophobia" supposedly written by Taylor Lorenz grew to nearly 500,000 likes in 24 hours. Several accounts would respond to this fake headline with a critique of the Washington Post and Generation Z, with one of the most high-profile cases being Christina Pushaw, the spokesperson of Florida governor Ron DeSantis. Lorenz later responded to this controversy with a tweet claiming she would write an actual article if she reached half a million followers, of which the article's title would later be used by the magazine LGBTQ Nation.

See also 
 List of individual dogs
 Lists of dogs
 Gay icon
 Internet celebrity

References 

Instagram accounts
Internet memes
Dog-related professions and professionals
2016 animal births